Hla Thein Swe is a Burmese military officer. He previously served as Deputy Minister of Finance and Revenue, beginning on 25 August 2003. He contested the 2012 Burmese by-elections, for a Pyithu Hluttaw seat representing Ottarathiri Township as a Union Solidarity and Development Party.

Hla Thein Swe was born on 8 March 1957. He is married to Thida Win.

References

1957 births
Burmese military personnel
Living people
Place of birth missing (living people)